Lutfur Rahman Kajal is a Bangladesh Nationalist Party politician and the former Member of Parliament from Cox's Bazar-3.

Early life
Kajal was born on 18 November 1960. He has a B.com degree.

Career
Kajal was elected to parliament in 2008 from Cox's Bazar-3 as a Bangladesh Nationalist Party candidate. Prime Minister Sheikh Hasina blamed him for the 2012 Ramu violence in which Muslims attacked Buddhist residents of Ramu Upazila.

References

Bangladesh Nationalist Party politicians
Living people
9th Jatiya Sangsad members
Year of birth missing (living people)